The 2012–13 V AFG season was the 63rd season of the Bulgarian V AFG, the third tier of the Bulgarian football league system. The winners of each of the four regional groups progressed to the 2013–14 B PFG and up to four teams from each group were relegated to regional amateur championships.

Changes from the 2011–12 season

Movement between B PFG and V AFG
The champions of the four 2011–12 V AFG divisions were promoted to the 2012–13 B PFG: Shumen 2010 from V AFG North-East and Rakovski 2011 from V AFG South-East, Spartak 1919 Pleven from V AFG North-West and Pirin Razlog from V AFG South-West. This season the B Grupa will be consisting of one division, so all third division champions will play against each other.

In return, Dorostol Silistra canceled their participation during the East B PFG championship and dissolved as club. Dobrudzha Dobrich and Nesebar finished at the bottom two places and relegated to the North-East and South-East division. Additionally Chernomorets Pomorie canceled their East B PFG participation after the end of the last season and dissolved as club.

From West B PFG relegated also four teams - Chavdar Byala Slatina canceled its participation during the season and dissolved as club, Slivnishki Geroi will play in the South-West V AFG, Malesh Mikrevo declined its further participation in the third division and Akademik Sofia have not received a professional licence, but due financial difficulties they canceled its participation in the South-West V AFG.

Movement from V Group to fourth-level leagues
 North-East: The teams of Rapid Divdyadovo merging mid-season with Shumen 2010 and Botev Novi Pazar resigning form the championship in different stages during winter break. Additionally Chernolomets Popovo decided not to participate in the new season. The new teams coming from the regional divisions are Kubrat, Ariston Ruse, Provadia and Silistra 2009.
 South-East: The group was left from Tundzha Yagoda and Rodopa Smolyan due to financial difficulties and Sportist Roza and Chirpan relegated after they finished at the bottom two places. The new teams are Haskovo 2009 and Vereya Stara Zagora.
 North-West: The group was joined only by Chavdar Troyan. This division was reduced after the relegation of Lokomotiv Dryanovo and dissolution of Yantra Gabrovo and Botev Krivodol.
 South-West: The new team is the newly founded Perun Kresna, since the old club renamed itself to OFC Pirin Blagoevgrad. Balkan Botevgrad relegated after only two games, Hebar Pazardzhik got nine points deduction which led to its relegation and OFC Hebar Pazardzhik could not afford its further participation. Levski Elin Pelin were also relegated. OFC Kostinbrod renamed itself to Botev Ihtiman, since the club united with the team from Ihtiman. Strumska slava Radomir should have relegated, but the team of Belaistsa Petrich could not afford further participation, thus Radomir avoided relegation.

Eastern divisions

North-East V AFG

South-East V AFG

Western divisions

North-West V AFG

South-West V AFG

References

Third Amateur Football League (Bulgaria) seasons
3
Bulgaria